A Giant Inverted Boomerang is a type of steel shuttle roller coaster manufactured by the Dutch firm Vekoma. The ride is a larger, inverted version of Vekoma's popular Boomerang sit down roller coasters. , four installations of the model are operating, with another one under construction.

History

Giant Inverted Boomerangs were slated to open for the start of the 2001 season at three Six Flags parks. Sudden errors and malfunctions during testing delayed these. The first to open was Déjà Vu at Six Flags Magic Mountain on August 25, 2001. Déjà Vu at Six Flags Magic Mountain has since been removed and relocated to Six Flags New England as Goliath. This was followed by the opening of a further two Giant Inverted Boomerangs named Déjà Vu on September 1, 2001, at Six Flags Over Georgia and on October 7, 2001, at Six Flags Great America. The opening of the fourth Giant Inverted Boomerang was delayed even more after the problems were discovered with the first three. Stunt Fall opened on August 8, 2002, at Parque Warner Madrid (then known as Warner Bros. Movie World Madrid).

In 2007, Six Flags announced the removal of Déjà Vu from both Six Flags Over Georgia and Six Flags Great America. They announced that the Six Flags Over Georgia ride would be replaced with a new themed area called Thomas Town (since rethemed to Whistlestop Park). After the Six Flags Great America ride gave its last rides on October 28, 2007, it was removed and replaced with the Buccaneer Battle ride.

In January 2008, Silverwood Theme Park in Idaho announced on its website that it would install the Déjà Vu from Six Flags Great America with a projected opening date of July that year. They later announced Déjà Vu would operate as Aftershock. Before opening at its new location, the ride was overhauled by Vekoma in order to make the ride more reliable. The ride officially opened July 21, 2008. Rocky Mountain Construction, an Idaho-based manufacturing firm, assisted with the construction of the ride.

In November 2009 it was announced that Mirabilandia in Brazil had purchased Six Flags Over Georgia's Déjà Vu. The ride was renamed Sky Mountain and is yet to open, but remains in storage at the park.

On August 16, 2011, Masslive reported that Six Flags New England was planning on building a Giant Inverted Boomerang for the park's 2012 season where the Shipwreck Falls attraction was located. On August 18, 2011, the ride was approved by the Agawam Planning Board, with the Los Angeles Times confirming one day later that Déjà Vu from Six Flags Magic Mountain would be relocated to Six Flags New England and would begin operation under a new name in 2012. An official announcement from Six Flags representatives was made on September 1, 2011, confirming previous reports and announcing that the relocated ride's name would be Goliath. On October 16, 2011, Déjà Vu operated for the final time. At around the same time, Shipwreck Falls was removed from Six Flags New England to make way for Goliath. Goliath at Six Flags New England was topped off on February 29, 2012. Goliath opened to the public on May 25, 2012.

In 2011, the first new Giant Inverted Boomerang since 2002 was constructed. Jinjiang Action Park opened the aptly named Giant Inverted Boomerang in September 2011. In 2014, Sochi Park Adventureland opened Quantum Leap, another Giant Inverted Boomerang.

Goliath was SBNO for a majority of the 2021 season until it began demolition later that year.

Installations

Ride

Layout and design
The Giant Inverted Boomerang is a departure from Vekoma's earlier Boomerang designs. This model features a vertical cable lift hill that quickly lifts the train up a vertical tower. Also, this model is larger than previous Boomerang designs. From above, the track layout looks like an 'X'.

Train
As a Giant Inverted Boomerang is a shuttle roller coaster, each installation only operates with a single train of eigh cars, each utilizing four-across seating, similar to that on Bolliger & Mabillard's inverted roller coasters. Giant Inverted Boomerang seats are staggered such that the outside seats are pushed back slightly behind the middle two seats in each row. The train seats a total of 32 riders.

Goliath at Six Flags New England featured a new train by Premier Rides (different from the originals built by Vekoma). This train had four-across seating, similar to Bolliger & Mabillard's inverted roller coasters. The new train design was chosen in an attempt to make the lines in the station less complicated to navigate and also to give the ride a higher capacity.

Experience
The ride begins when the train slowly backs out of the station and up the vertical lift, pulled by a catch car. This element contains two of the three inversions found on the ride going forward. A catch car there pulls the train up the second vertical tower, this time with riders facing the sky. After the train reaches the top of the tower, it is released to cycle backward through the layout. The train then goes through the station and heads up the first vertical lift again, where it is caught once more by the catch car and then very slowly lowered back into the station.

Ed Markey analysis
After the announcement of Goliath on September 1, 2011, U.S. Representative Ed Markey, with S.I. Sheikh and A.B. Singhal from the Massachusetts General Hospital, told The Boston Herald: “Fixed-site amusement park rides like those at Six Flags New England are exempt from federal oversight due to a 30-year-old special-interest loophole. This means that even as these rides get faster and taller, safety rules remain stuck in a state-by-state patchwork that leaves riders vulnerable. Also, the jerky motions of these rides have been linked to small tears in arteries or a spike in blood pressure, but we aren’t sure if there is necessarily a cause-and-effect relationship.”

Rankings
All Giant Inverted Boomerang models currently hold the records for the second biggest drop on an inverted roller coaster; the third highest inverted roller coaster; and the fifth fastest inverted roller coaster.

See also
 2011 in amusement parks
 2012 in amusement parks

References

External links

 Official website
 Listing of Giant Inverted Boomerang roller coasters at the Roller Coaster DataBase
 Video of Déjà Vu roller coaster
 Déjà Vu: Detailed Review

Roller coasters introduced in 2001
Boomerang roller coasters
Inverted roller coasters
Shuttle roller coasters
Steel roller coasters
Roller coasters manufactured by Vekoma
Vekoma